The Bowmaker Tournament was an invitation pro-am golf tournament played from 1957 to 1970. Except in the first and final years the tournament was held at Sunningdale Golf Club. The main event was a 36-hole stroke play event for the professionals played over two days. There was also a better-ball event for the professional/amateur pairs.

The Bowmaker Tournament finished in 1970 but was replaced by the Sunbeam Electric Tournament which had the same format and was also played the week before The Open Championship. The Sunbeam Electric sponsorship lasted for just one year. In 1972 and 1973 they were the sponsors of the Sunbeam Electric Scottish Open.

In the 1965 tournament Kel Nagle started his final round with an albatross two at the 492-yard first hole.

Winners

References

Golf tournaments in England